The men's Greco-Roman 85 kilograms is a competition featured at the 1999 World Wrestling Championships, and was held at the Peace and Friendship Stadium in Piraeus, Athens, Greece from 24 to 26 September 1999.

Results
Legend
F — Won by fall
R — Retired

Preliminary round

Pool 1

Pool 2

Pool 3

Pool 4

Pool 5

Pool 6

Pool 7

Pool 8

Pool 9

Pool 10

Pool 11

Knockout round

 Behrouz Jamshidi of Iran originally won the bronze medal, but was disqualified after he tested positive for doping. Raatbek Sanatbayev was upgraded to the bronze medal position.

References

Men's Greco-Roman 85 kg